Sekhobe is a community council located in the Butha-Buthe District of Lesotho. Its population in 2006 was 3,874.

Villages
The community of Sekhobe includes the villages of Ha Lehloare, Ha Maphale, Ha Moetsuoa (Kutu-Kutu), Ha Sekhobe (Motete), Kopanong, Lemphane, Liqalaneng, Liqhobong, Liteleng, Manganeng, Maoelaoela, Maphepheng, Patuoe (Motete), Phokojoe-Khoaba, Pulane, Sebebeng, Setonong and Thoteng (Motete).

References

External links
 Google map of community villages

Populated places in Butha-Buthe District